The Execution of Private Slovik is a nonfiction book by William Bradford Huie, published in 1954, and an American made-for-television movie that aired on NBC on March 13, 1974. The film was written for the screen by Richard Levinson, William Link, and director Lamont Johnson; the film stars Martin Sheen, and also features Charlie Sheen in his second film in a small role.

Plot
The book and the film tell the story of Private Eddie Slovik, the only American military serviceman executed for desertion (during World War II) since the Civil War.

Background
The film starred Martin Sheen as Private Slovik, a performance for which he received an Emmy Award nomination for Best Lead Actor in a Drama. Sheen said he did not think actors should be compared, and made it clear he would refuse the award. Many critics and viewers consider this to be one of Sheen's finest performances. Among the other Emmy Award nominations, the film was named for "Outstanding Special". The film also won a Peabody Award.

Cast
 Martin Sheen as Pvt. Eddie Slovik
 Mariclare Costello as Antoinette Slovik
 Ned Beatty as Father Stafford
 Gary Busey as Jimmy Feedek
 Matt Clark as Dunn
 Charles Haid as Brockmeyer
 Kathryn Grody as Margaret
 Paul Lambert as Joe Sirelli
 Jon Cedar as Holloway
 Laurence Haddon as Piper
 Charlie Sheen as kid at wedding (uncredited)

Development
Frank Sinatra announced in 1960 that he would produce a film adaptation of The Execution of Private Slovik, with the screenplay to be written by Albert Maltz, who was one of the Hollywood 10 blacklisted after they refused to testify to the House Un-American Activities Committee (HUAC) in the McCarthy era. This announcement evoked tremendous outrage, with Sinatra accused of being a Communist sympathizer. As Sinatra was campaigning for John F. Kennedy for President, the Kennedy campaign became concerned and ultimately prevailed upon Sinatra to cancel the project.

In 1949, a Pentagon source revealed to Huie a European graveyard containing the remains of unidentified American soldiers. Huie's investigation identified Slovik's name and grave. Huie's account of Slovik is an example of his style of reporting and his tendency to anger Dwight D. Eisenhower, who had authorized the execution as commander of the Allied Forces, and who tried to stop publication of the book. Award-winning filmmaker Richard Dubelman acquired the film rights from Sinatra. Some years later, Dubelman persuaded Universal Pictures to help him produce it as a television movie.

Reception
Television critic Matt Zoller Seitz in his 2016 book co-written with Alan Sepinwall titled TV (The Book) named The Execution of Private Slovik as the third greatest American TV-movie of all time, behind Duel (1971) and The Positively True Adventures of the Alleged Texas Cheerleader-Murdering Mom (1993). Seitz praised Martin Sheen's performance as "one of his finest" and stated that the film is "as close to a perfect character study as network TV has produced, quietly outraged yet somehow resolutely unsentimental".

Historical accuracy
The military service record of Slovik, which is now a public archival record available from the Military Personnel Records Center, provides a detailed account of his actual execution. It was upon this that most of the film was based. The execution in the film, including the missed shots by the firing squad which led to Slovik dying slowly on the firing post over a course of five minutes, are accurate as compared to the actual execution.

In popular culture
The 1963 World War II film The Victors includes a scene depicting the Christmas Eve execution of a GI deserter modeled after Slovik, accompanied by a Sinatra Christmas recording. 
In Kurt Vonnegut's 1969 novel Slaughterhouse-Five, Billy Pilgrim finds an abandoned copy of Huie's book about Slovik and reads through it while in a waiting room.
The Canadian novel Execution and its adaptations tell a similar tale, based on the execution of Canadian soldier Harold Pringle for desertion in World War II.

See also
List of American films of 1974

References

External links

1974 films
1974 television films
1974 war films
1970s English-language films
Court-martial
Films about capital punishment
Films about deserters
Films directed by Lamont Johnson
Films set in 1945
Military courtroom films
NBC network original films
Peabody Award-winning broadcasts
Universal Pictures films
Western Front of World War II films
World War II films based on actual events